Liolope is a monotypic genus of trematodes, or fluke worms, belonging to the family Liolopidae. The only species is Liolope copulans.

Baba et al. (2011) classified this species in the family Liolopidae, superfamily Diplostomoidea.

Distribution
This species occurs in Japan.

Life cycle
The first intermediate hosts of Liolope copulans include freshwater snails Semisulcospira libertina.

The second (experimental) intermediate host include fish Nipponocypris sieboldii and Rhynchocypris lagowskii.

The final hosts include Japanese giant salamander Andrias japonicus.

References

Digenea
Animals described in 1902